Alexandra Christine Schneiderman (born December 9, 1996), known professionally as AleXa and formerly Alex Christine, is an American singer based in South Korea. After competing in both seasons of the reality show Rising Legends, AleXa signed with Zanybros' ZB Label in 2018 and trained there for roughly two and a half years. During this time, she also competed on Mnet's Produce 48. She debuted as a K-pop singer in October 2019. In 2022, she represented her home state Oklahoma in NBC's American Song Contest with the song "Wonderland" where she won with 710 points.

Early life 
AleXa was born Alexaundra Christine Schneiderman on December 9, 1996, in Tulsa, Oklahoma, to a Russian American father and a South Korean mother. AleXa’s mother was adopted at age five by her adoptive American parents from an orphanage in Goyang, Gyeonggi Province, where she last saw her brother. AleXa is the elder of two siblings and has a younger sister and two brothers.

As a child, AleXa took dancing lessons for various genres, including ballet, jazz, hip hop, and tap. She began to dance when she was eighteen months old and continued into mid-high school. She attended Jenks High School where she was a member of the show choirs Jenks Varsity Pom and the Jenks Trojanaires, which competed nationally. She attended Tulsa Community College, where she participated in theatre. AleXa was an avid K-pop fan and created both an Instagram and Snapchat account dedicated to covering K-pop songs and choreography while in school.

Musical career

2016–2018: Rising Legends and Produce 48 

In 2016, under the name Alex Christine, she participated in the Rising Legends online audition run by Soompi. The competition was organized in partnership with JYP Entertainment. In 2017, she competed on Rising Legends again when Soompi partnered with Cube Entertainment. Despite placing #1 in the dance category the first time and the overall winner the second, she did not make it into either of the companies' trainee programs and instead signed with ZB Label as their first (and as of 2022, only) in-house artist. In 2018, AleXa competed on Produce 48 and was eliminated in the first round at #82.

2019–2021: Debut, Do or Die and Decoherence 

In 2019, AleXa released her debut single album titled "Bomb" on October 19. She collaborated with rock band Diablo to release a rock version of the song on December 13.

In 2020, she announced her first mini-album with the release of the trailer "A.I Trooper" on February 24. The music video "Do or Die" was released on March 6. The mini-album, also titled Do or Die, was released on April 1. AleXa collaborated with girl group Dreamcatcher and boy group IN2IT to release the single "Be The Future" for the Millenasia Project on May 6. The project, supported by UNESCO's Global Education Coalition, was released to bring attention to the importance of education and safety during the COVID-19 pandemic. On July 16, AleXa released the music video for "Villain" from her upcoming second mini-album titled Decoherence. She released the mini-album alongside the music video for "Revolution" on October 21.

In 2021, AleXa released her digital single "Never Let You Go" on January 14. She collaborated with rock band Onewe to release an acoustic version of the song on February 8. On April 12, AleXa released the OST "I Miss You Every Day" for the TV Chosun drama Somehow Family. On May 18, Spotify announced its third RADAR collaboration in the MENA region, bringing together AleXa and Bader AlShuaibi, a Kuwaiti-Saudi pop singer. The song "Is It On" was released on May 21. AleXa released her second single album ReviveR and its lead track "Xtra" on July 1. She collaborated with all-female rock band Rolling Quartz to release the rock version of the song on August 25.

2022–present: American Song Contest 

In 2022, AleXa released her third single album Tattoo on January 6. On March 3, AleXa was announced as one of the contestants to compete in the American Song Contest, representing Oklahoma with the song "Wonderland". On May 9th, 2022 it was announced she won the competition.
In July 2022, AleXa held a fan meeting in the United States.

In August 2022, it was announced that AleXa would hold solo concerts in eight US cities in October.

In October 2022, AleXa announced that it would release her third mini album Girls Gone Vogue on November 11.On October 31st, ZB Label announced that the album promotions scheduled for this week have been postponed due to the Seoul Halloween crowd crush.

Other ventures 
From June 23 to August 4, 2020, AleXa served as a guest host on the podcast How Did I Get Here?, often shortened to "HDIGH". On August 7, 2020, Dive Studios announced on their Twitter that she would become a permanent fixture on the show alongside original host Jae Park from Korean band Day6. The podcast won the "People's Choice" and "Entertainment" category at the Podcast Award in 2020. It also went on to win Best Podcast 2020 from Apple Podcasts.

On January 29, 2021, AleXa created a new YouTube channel called AleXa 360 focusing on vlogs and behind the scenes footage.

On March 18, it was announced that AleXa would be making her acting debut in the anthology horror film, Urban Myths.

Discography

Extended plays

Single albums

Singles

Collaborations

OST

Filmography

Film

Television shows

Web shows

Podcast host

Hosting

Awards and nominations

References

External links 
 

1996 births
Living people
21st-century American women singers
21st-century American singers
21st-century South Korean women singers
American dance musicians
American women pop singers
South Korean dance musicians
South Korean female idols
South Korean women pop singers
Korean-language singers of the United States
American people of Russian descent
American musicians of Korean descent
South Korean people of American descent
South Korean people of Russian descent
Produce 48 contestants
American Song Contest contestants
Musicians from Tulsa, Oklahoma
Singers from Oklahoma